Castruccio is a given name. Notable people with the name include:

Castruccio Castracane degli Antelminelli (1779–1852), Italian Roman Catholic cardinal
Castruccio Castracani (1281–1328), Italian condottiero and duke of Lucca

Masculine given names